John Rosengrant is an American make-up and special effects artist. He was nominated for an Academy Award in the category Best Visual Effects for the film Real Steel. Rosengrant has also won three Primetime Emmy Awards in the category Outstanding Special and Visual Effects for his work on the television programs The Mandalorian and The Book of Boba Fett. He founded the company Legacy Effects with Lindsay Macgowan, Shane Mahan and Alan Scott.

Selected filmography 
 Real Steel (2011; co-nominated with Erik Nash, Danny Gordon Taylor and Swen Gillberg)

References

External links 

Living people
Place of birth missing (living people)
Year of birth missing (living people)
American make-up artists
Special effects people
Special effects coordinators
Primetime Emmy Award winners
Louisiana State University alumni